The Appalachian Uplands is a physiographic region in Canada. It is one of seven physiographic regions in Canada distinguished by its topography and geology. The region includes southern Quebec, Gaspésie, New Brunswick, Nova Scotia, Prince Edward Island and the island of Newfoundland.

Physiographic regions and divisions
Each physiographic region, subregion and division has its own subregions and divisions—distinguished by topography and geology.

Distinctive features
Features include Gros Morne National Park and the Newfoundland Highlands in Newfoundland, the Cobequid Mountains, Antigonish Highlands, Cape Breton Highlands, Nova Scotia Uplands, and the Annapolis Lowlands in Nova Scotia, the New Brunswick Highlands, Notre-Dame Mountains including the Chic-Chocs Mountains, Sutton Mountains, and Mégantic Hills in Quebec, and the Maritime Plain, "which stretches around the coast of New Brunswick and Nova Scotia from the south shore of Chaleur Bay and includes Prince Edward Island and Îles-de-la-Madeleine."

References

Regions of Canada

Physiographic regions of Canada